HMS Venus (renamed HMS Heroine in 1809) was the name ship of the 36-gun Venus-class fifth-rate frigates of the Royal Navy.  She was launched in 1758 and served for more than half a century until 1809. She was reduced from 36 to 32 guns in 1792. She was sold in 1822.

Career
On 18 May 1759, Venus, HMS Thames, and HMS Chatham, were in company when Venus intercepted the French frigate Arethuse near Audierne Bay (Baie d'Audierne ). After a two-hour chase, Arethuse lost her top masts and was overtaken. Thames and Venus engaged her with heavy fire, causing 60 casualties before she surrendered. Arethuse subsequently had a lengthy career as HMS Arethusa.
 and Venus captured the French East Indiaman Bertin  on 3 April 1761 and sent her into Plymouth. There the Royal Navy purchased her and commissioned as the third rate .

American Revolution
Mount Hope Bay raids: She participated in the Raids.

French Revolutionary Wars
On 27 May 1793, Venus, Captain Jonathon Faulkner, encountered the French frigate La Sémillante south-west of Cape Finisterre which resulted in close action. "The sails, rigging and spars of the British frigate had taken the brunt of the enemy fire and were extremely cut up so that a further engagement was inadvisable. Indeed she was lucky to escape an encounter with a fresh opponent."

On 17 July 1801, Tromp, and Venus left Portsmouth with a convoy to the West Indies.

Napoleonic Wars
On the morning of 10 July 1805, Venus encountered the French privateer brig Hirondelle. After a chase of 65 miles, during which Hirondelle threw two of her 6-pounder guns overboard, Venus succeeded in capturing her quarry. Hirondelle, of Dunkirk, was armed with four 6-pounder guns and twelve 3-pounder guns, and had a crew of 90 men. She left Gigeon, Spain, on 27 June, but had not captured anything. However, on prior cruise, she had captured several vessels, most notably the Falmouth packet Queen Charlotte, which had resisted for some two hours before striking her colours.

On 18 January 1807 Venus captured the French privateer brig Determinée of Guadeloupe, one hundred leagues east of Barbados after a chase of 16 hours. Determinée had a crew of 108 men and was pierced for 20 guns but carried only 14.

Venus was paid-off and put into Ordinary in July 1807 at Woolwich. On 14 July 1807 she was renamed Heroine after the capture of the Danish vessel .

Between March and May 1809 she was fitted for Baltic service. Captain Hood Hanway Christian recommissioned Heroine in March and commanded her until November 1809. Heroine participated in the reduction of Flushing in 1809 during the Walcheren Campaign. In this engagement Heroine was part of a squadron of ten frigates under the command of Captain Lord William Stuart.
On 11 August 1809 this squadron sailed up the western Scheldt under a light wind, suffering minor damage from the shore batteries of Flushing and Cadzand. Two men were wounded on Heroine.

Fate
Heroine was paid off and laid up at Sheerness between November 1809 and December 1823. Between 1817 and 1820 she served as a receiving ship. Then between December 1823 and June 1824 she underwent fitting at Woolwich to serve as a temporary convict ship. The Principal Officers and Commissioners of His Majesty's Navy offered "Heroine, of 32 guns and 722 tons", lying at Deptford, for sale on 22 September 1828. She was sold on that date to John Small Sedger for £1,170.

Notes, citations, and references
Notes

Citations

References

 Gardiner, Robert The First Frigates, Conway Maritime Press, London 1992. .

 Lyon, David The Sailing Navy List, Conway Maritime Press, London 1993. .

 .

 

1758 ships
Ships built on the River Mersey
Fifth-rate frigates of the Royal Navy